The women's 5000 metres at the 2019 World Para Athletics Championships was held in Dubai on 13 November 2019.

Medalists

T54

Records

Final 

The final was started on 13 November at 19:36.

See also 
List of IPC world records in athletics

References 

5000 metres
2019 in women's athletics
5000 metres at the World Para Athletics Championships